Dichagyris arabella is a species of cutworm or dart moth in the family Noctuidae.

The MONA or Hodges number for Dichagyris arabella is 10873.1.

References

Further reading

 
 
 

arabella
Articles created by Qbugbot
Moths described in 1901
Moths of North America